Syskanovo (Sısqan) is a rural locality (a village) in Sakhayevsky Selsoviet, Karmaskalinsky District, Bashkortostan, Russia. The population was 109 as of 2010. There are 2 streets.

Geography 
Syskanovo is located 27 km northeast of Karmaskaly (the district's administrative centre) by road. Krasnoyarovo is the nearest rural locality.

References 

Rural localities in Karmaskalinsky District